MathCast is a graphical mathematics equation editor. With this computer application, a user can create equations in mathematical notation and use them in documents or web pages. Equations can be rendered into pictures or transformed into MathML. 

MathCast features a Rapid Mathline, Equation List Management, and XHTML authoring.

MathCast is a free software application distributed under the GNU General Public License.

External links
MathCast home page
Sourceforge project page

Formula editors